The Broadcasting Satellite System Corporation (B-SAT) is a Japanese corporation established in April 1993 to procure, manage and lease transponders on communications satellites. Its largest stockholder, owning 49.9%, is NHK, the Japan Broadcasting Corporation. In 1994, it was ranked by Space News as the world's 19th largest fixed satellite operator.

Satellite fleet 
The B-SAT fleet has an extensive history. This is an overview of the satellites.

Former satellites 
These satellites were managed by Broadcasting Satellite System Corporation but are now decommissioned.

BSAT-1a 
BSAT-1a was an HS-376 based satellite with 4 active plus 4 spares Ku-band transponders. It was successfully launched on 16 April 1997 aboard an Ariane 44LP along Thaicom 3.

BSAT-1b 
BSAT-1b was an HS-376 based satellite with 4 active plus 4 spares Ku-band transponders. It was successfully launched on 28 April 1998 aboard an Ariane 44P along Nilesat 101.

BSAT-2a 
BSAT-2a was manufactured by Orbital Sciences Corporation based on the Star Bus platform. It was launched aboard an Ariane 5G rocket on 8 March 2001. BSAT-2a serves as an on orbit backup to BSAT-2c. BSAT-2a was decommissioned in January 2013.

BSAT-2b 
BSAT-2b was a twin of BSAT-2a, also based on the Star Bus platform. Launched along Artemis aboard an Ariane 5G, it was left on an unusable orbit and that it couldn't compensate for. The electric propulsion Artemis, could use its higher efficiency ion drives, to reach operational orbit.

BSAT-2c 
BSAT-2c was manufactured by Orbital Sciences Corporation Based on the Star Bus platform. It was launched aboard an Ariane 5 rocket on 11 June 2003. In-orbit delivery to B-SAT took place 15 July 2003. BSAT-2c was decommissioned in August 2013.

Current satellites 
The current fleet of Broadcasting Satellite System Corporation as of August 2020 is composed of five spacecraft.

BSAT-3a 
Launched on 14 August 2007 by an Ariane 5 ECA launch vehicle. It was manufactured by Lockheed Martin Commercial Space Systems based on the A2100A platform design, with a communications payload containing 12 Ku-band channels, eight of which operate at one time. Located in geostationary orbit at 110.0° East longitude, it replaced BSAT-1a and BSAT-1b.

BSAT-3b 
B-SAT awarded Lockheed Martin the contract to build its next geostationary telecommunications satellite, BSAT-3b, which was launched by Arianespace aboard an Ariane 5 ECA (along with the Eutelsat W3B) on 28 October 2010.

BSAT-3c 
BSAT-3c, also known as JCSAT-110R, is a satellite co-owned with SKY Perfect JSAT with each operator owning a separate payload. It was built by Lockheed Martin on its A2100A platform. It has two separate payloads with 12 Ku-band transponders each. It was successfully launched on 7 August 2011 on an Ariane 5 ECA along Astra 1N.

BSAT-4a 
The first satellite of the fourth generation BSAT was built by SSL on its SSL 1300 platform. BSAT-4a launched on 29 September 2017 aboard an Ariane 5 ECA.

BSAT-4b 
The second satellite of the fourth generation BSAT was built by Maxar Technologies on its SSL 1300 platform. BSAT-4b was launched aboard an Ariane 5 ECA on 15 August 2020.

Satellite list

References 

Communications satellite operators
Direct broadcast satellite services
Telecommunications companies of Japan
Telecommunications companies established in 1993
Japanese companies established in 1993
Mass media companies established in 1993
NHK